The individual competition of the nordic combined events at the 2016 Winter Youth Olympics in Lillehammer, Norway, was held on February 16, at the Lysgårdsbakken with one ski jump and a 5 kilometre cross-country race. 14 athletes from 14 different countries took part in this event.

Results

Ski jumping 
Ski jumping  starts on 10:45

Cross-country 
Cross-country  starts on 13:30

References

Nordic combined at the 2016 Winter Youth Olympics